Li Na defeated the defending champion Francesca Schiavone in the final, 6–4, 7–6(7–0) to win the women's singles tennis title at the 2011 French Open. It was her first major title, and she became the first Asian and Chinese player to win a major.

Caroline Wozniacki and Kim Clijsters were in contention for the world No. 1 ranking; Wozniacki retained the top ranking after Clijsters lost in the second round, despite herself losing in the third round. This was the first time in the Open Era that neither of the top two seeds of a major progressed past the third round.

This was the first French Open since 1996 where neither Venus Williams nor Serena Williams participated. It was also the only major between the 2003 US Open and the 2021 US Open where neither of the Williams sisters participated.

This also marked the major debut of future world No. 3, US Open champion, and French Open finalist Sloane Stephens; she was defeated by Elena Baltacha in the first round.

Seeds

Qualifying

Draw

Finals

Top half

Section 1

Section 2

Section 3

Section 4

Bottom half

Section 5

Section 6

Section 7

Section 8

Championship match statistics

References

External links
 Main Draw
2011 French Open – Women's draws and results at the International Tennis Federation

Women's Singles
French Open by year – Women's singles
French Open - Women's Singles
2011 in women's tennis
2011 in French women's sport